Bio Aï Traoré (born 9 June 1985) is a Beninese international football player who currently plays in Benin for Panthères FC.

Career 
He began to play for Panthères FC who are based in Djougou.

International 
Traoré first called up was for the 2010 FIFA World Cup qualification against Uganda national football team on 12 October 2008.

References

External links 
 

1985 births
Living people
Beninese footballers
Benin international footballers
2008 Africa Cup of Nations players
People from Porto-Novo
Association football defenders